(born 14 November 1980 in Nishinomiya) is a Japanese long-distance runner who specializes in the marathon race. In 2003, she competed in the women's marathon at the 2003 World Championships in Athletics held in Paris, France. She finished in 4th place.

Achievements

Personal bests
5000 metres - 15:45.75 min (2002)
10,000 metres - 33:06.17 min (2003)
Half marathon - 1:09:27 hrs (2001)
Marathon - 2:21:51 hrs (2003)

References

External links
 
 Sports Reference

1980 births
Living people
Japanese female long-distance runners
Athletes (track and field) at the 2004 Summer Olympics
Olympic athletes of Japan
Olympic female marathon runners
People from Nishinomiya
Japanese female marathon runners
World Athletics Championships athletes for Japan
20th-century Japanese women
21st-century Japanese women